The 2002 Hindu Kush earthquakes struck in northern Afghanistan during the month of March. At least 166 people were killed with a very large and intermediate-depth mainshock on March 3. Three weeks later, at least a further two-thousand were killed during a large, but shallow event that had a maximum Mercalli intensity of VII (Very strong). The M7.4 and M6.1 reverse events were focused in the Hindu Kush mountain range area.

Tectonic setting
Northern Afghanistan lies within the broad zone of continuing collision between the Indian Plate and the Eurasian Plate. The area is seismically active, particularly as a result of faulting at just over 200 km depth within the descending slab. Many large events of M ≥ 7 have been observed in the Hindu Kush, all with similar epicenters, with an approximate periodicity of about 10–15 years. These events have reverse fault focal mechanisms, which for the near-vertical slab indicates active extension. It has been proposed that these earthquakes are a result of "necking" of the downgoing slab, a process that may eventually lead to break-off.

Smaller shallow focus earthquakes are also observed in the region, particularly associated with north–south trending zones of right lateral strike-slip, such as the Chaman Fault, with an increasing degree of shortening to the north, together accommodating the highly oblique convergence between the Indian Plate and the Eurasian Plate.

Earthquakes
The earthquake on March 3 had a magnitude of 7.4 , with a hypocentral depth of 225.6 km. The focal mechanism is consistent with reverse faulting within subducting oceanic crust. Comparison with similar earthquakes in 1993 and 2015, which have very similar depths and epicenters, suggests that the major component of the slip in all three events occurred on the same part of the fault.

The earthquake on March 25 had a magnitude of 6.1 , with a hypocentral depth of 8.0 km. It had a reverse fault mechanism that occurred on one of two possible moderately-dipping north–south trending faults.

Damage

March 3 event 
At 12:08:19 UTC a 7.4 tremor hit an area  S of Feyzabad, Afghanistan. At least 150 people were killed, several injured and 400 houses damaged or destroyed by a landslide that dammed and flooded Surkundara Valley, Samangan Province. At least 13 people were killed at Kabul and Rostaq and 3 people killed in Bajaur, Pakistan. At least 300 houses were destroyed in Badakhshan and Takhar Provinces. A 45 meter wide fissure opened in Xiker Reservoir in Xinjiang, China. This was a deep focus event and was felt in much of Afghanistan and Pakistan. Felt also in Tajikistan, Uzbekistan, Kyrgyzstan, Kazakhstan and India.

March 25 event 
At least 2,000 people were killed and over 3,000 were injured. This was a shallow focus event and was felt strongly in much of northern Afghanistan. Also felt in the Islamabad-Peshawar area, Pakistan and at Dushanbe, Tajikistan.

See also 

 List of earthquakes in 2002
 List of earthquakes in Afghanistan

References 

Sources

External links
 
 

2002 disasters in Asia 
2002 disasters in Afghanistan
2002 disasters in Pakistan
2002 in Pakistan
2002 earthquakes
2002 in Afghanistan
May 2002 events in Asia
Earthquakes in Afghanistan
Earthquakes in Pakistan
Earthquake clusters, swarms, and sequences
History of Afghanistan (1992–present)
2002 earthqaukes